The Akhvakh language (also spelled Axvax, Akhwakh) is a Northeast Caucasian language from the Avar–Andic branch. Ethnologue lists 210 speakers based on the 2010 census, but Magomedova and Abulaeva (2007) list 20,000 speakers of the language. Akhvakh has several dialects, though sources do not agree on the number. Ethnologue lists Kaxib, Northern Akhvakh and Southern Akhvakh (which can be further subdivided into the Tlyanub and Tsegob subdialects). Creissels (2010) lists Northern Akhvakh and three dialects of Southern Akhvakh (Cegob, Tljanub, and Ratlub).

A few publications have been made in the Akhvakh language, but for the most part speakers of Akhvakh have adopted Avar as their literary language.

Phonology

Consonants 

As with Avar, there are competing analyses of the distinction transcribed in the table with the length sign . Length is part of the distinction, but so is articulatory strength, so they have been analyzed as fortis and lenis. The fortis affricates are long in the fricative part of the contour, e.g.  (tss), not in the stop part as in geminate affricates in languages such as Japanese and Italian  (tts). Laver (1994) analyzes e.g.  as a two-segment affricate–fricative sequence .

Vowels 
Akhvakh has a standard five-vowel system /i e a o u/ with distinctive vowel length.

Grammar

Agreement classes
Akhvakh has three agreement classes.  In the singular, these are human masculine, human feminine, and non-human. In the plural, there are only two—human plural and non-human plural.  Akhvakh verbs agree with the absolutive argument (subject of an intransitive or object of a transitive.)

Consider the following examples, which show the general principles.  In the first example, the intransitive verb 'run' shows feminine agreement because its subject, 'girl', is feminine.  In the second example, the transitive verb 'cook' shows neuter agreement because its object, 'meat', is neuter. (Creissels 2010:114)

Note that in the second example, 'wife' is in the ergative case and appears to be the subject of both the verbs 'cook' and 'eat', but neither verb shows feminine agreement.

Cases
Akhvakh has an ergative-absolutive case-marking system. As the following examples (repeated from above) show, the transitive subject has the ergative case, while an intransitive subject has absolutive case.  Absolutive case is not overtly marked by a suffix, but the noun phrase with absolutive case controls agreement on the verb:

In addition to the ergative and absolutive cases, Akhvakh has eighteen other cases, for a total of twenty cases (Creissels 2010:108-9).  The additional cases are
dative
genitive
comitative
purposive
fifteen spatial cases, arrayed in five series of three.

Notes

References 
Creissels, Denis. 2009. Participles and Finiteness: The Case of Akhvakh.  Linguistic Discovery, vol 7:1. http://journals.dartmouth.edu/cgi-bin/WebObjects/Journals.woa/2/xmlpage/1/article/334.
Creissels, Denis. 2010. Specialized converbs and adverbial subordination in Axaxdərə Akhvakh.  In Clause linking and clause hierarchy: Syntax and pragmatics, ed. by Isabelle Bril.  Amsterdam: John Benjamins. pp. 105–142.
Magomedova, Patimat and Abdulaeva, Indira. 2007. Axkaxsko-russkij slovar'. Maxačkala: Dagestanskij Naučnyj Centr Rossiskoj Akademii Nauk.

Further reading
 Wixman, Ronald. The Peoples of the USSR: An Ethnographic Handbook. (Armonk, New York: M. E. Sharpe, Inc, 1984), p. 8
 Olson, James S., An Ethnohistorical Dictionary of the Russian and Soviet Empires. (Westport: Greenwood Press, 1994), pp. 25–26
 Магомедбекова З. М. Ахвахский язык: Грамматический анализ, тексты, словарь. Тб., 1967
 Богуславская О. Ю. Ахвахский язык // Языки Российской федерации и соседних государств. Т. 1. М., 1997

External links
 

Northeast Caucasian languages
Andic languages
Languages of Russia
Endangered Caucasian languages